M. Motiur Rahman Talukdar is a Bangladesh Nationalist Party politician and the former Member of Parliament of Barguna-3.

Career
Talukdar was elected to parliament from Barguna-3 as a Bangladesh Nationalist Party candidate in 2001.

References

Bangladesh Nationalist Party politicians
Living people
8th Jatiya Sangsad members
Year of birth missing (living people)